Lachnocephala is a monotypic moth genus in the family Geometridae described by David Stephen Fletcher in 1953. Its only species, Lachnocephala vellosata, known from Chile, was described by the same author in the same year.

References

Archiearinae
Geometridae genera
Monotypic moth genera
Endemic fauna of Chile